The Revolt of the Cockroach People is a novel by Oscar Zeta Acosta. It tells the story of a Chicano lawyer, "Buffalo Zeta Brown," fictionalizing events from Oscar Acosta's own life, including the East L.A. walkouts at Garfield High School, the founding of the Brown Berets, the Christmas protests at St. Basil's church, the Castro v. Superior Court decision of 1970, Acosta's run for sheriff of Los Angeles County later that year, the Chicano National Moratorium, and the death of Ruben Salazar, who is referred to as "Roland Zanzibar" in the novel. Acosta uses the historical events of the late 1960s and early 1970s "as the context for the construction of a Chicano identity and the realization of a revolutionary class consciousness."

Acosta frames Brown as a lawyer who understands the United States's legal system as both arbitrary and differential and therefore comes to the realization that an "objective truth" can never materialize "either in the courtroom or elsewhere." Through the character of Brown, Acosta acknowledges that what is understood as "truth" is a social construct or cultural convention. This realization is destabilizing yet invigorating for Brown, who understands that law can function both "as a tool of repression but it may also be used to project a radically new form of legality that cannot be achieved within present institutions," as described by Mexican-American scholar Ramón Saldívar. Saldívar characterizes this as an important moment for Brown (and Acosta), as he understands that "ideological commitment to a cause" is not a matter of identifying "truth" or "falsehood" but an "issue of taking sides in a struggle between embattled groups."

Plot 
Brown becomes involved with the Chicano movement when he moved to Los Angeles in 1968 looking to write a book. He spent three years with the Chicano Militants, defending them in various court cases and helping to organize protests and marches. The novel depicts the radical Chicano movement in the fictional barrio of "Tooner Flats" in East Los Angeles. The leaders are eventually indicted on charges of conspiracy to disrupt the schools. Brown defends them and wins.

References

External links
  Study resource for The Revolt of the Cockroach People

1972 American novels
American autobiographical novels
Novels by Oscar Zeta Acosta
Hispanic and Latino American novels
Novels set in Los Angeles
Fiction set in 1970
Fictional cockroaches
Chicano
Chicano literature